Humaid bin Rashid Al Nuaimi II was the ruler of Ajman, one of the Trucial States which today form the United Arab Emirates (UAE), from 1891–1900.

He was a signatory to the 1892 'Exclusive Agreement', which bound the Trucial Rulers not to enter into 'any agreement or correspondence with any Power other than the British Government' and that without British assent, they would not 'consent to the residence within my territory of the agent of any other government' and that they would not 'cede, sell, mortgage or otherwise give for occupation any part of my territory, save to the British Government.

The agreement came at a time when commercial interest was being shown in the Trucial States by other nations, including Germany, Turkey and France. Immediately prior to the signing of the agreement, a representative of the Persian Government had attempted to establish a Persian claim to the territory, obviating any British interest. The 1892 agreement brought the adventure to an early conclusion.

September 1892 saw Humid bin Rashid beating off an attack by Ajman's old rival and sometime ally, Sharjah together with Umm Al Qawain. Despatching a boat full of armed men to aid Humaid in meeting the attack, Rashid bin Maktoum breached the 1853 Maritime Truce and was forced to pay a fine.

Humaid bin Rashid was not popular among his peers, having failed to pay allowances from the state revenue to his family members. On the morning of 8 July 1900 he was murdered and his uncle, Abdulaziz bin Humaid, assumed power.

References 

1900 deaths
Sheikhs of the Emirate of Ajman
19th-century monarchs in the Middle East
History of the United Arab Emirates
19th-century Arabs